The 1977–78 Rugby League Premiership was the fourth end of season Rugby League Premiership competition.

The winners were Bradford Northern.

First round

Semi-finals

Final

References

1978 in English rugby league